Dong Dajie (东大街), meaning "Eastern Avenue" in Chinese, is the name of several main roads and markets in China.

Dong Dajie, a notable thoroughfare and market in Xian, Shaanxi
Dong Dajie, a main thoroughfare in Dunhuang, Gansu, home of the Dunhuang Night Market